is a former Nippon Professional Baseball pitcher.

References 

1967 births
Brother Elephants players
Chiba Lotte Marines players
Hanshin Tigers players
Japanese expatriate baseball players in Taiwan
Japanese expatriate baseball players in the United States
Living people
Managers of baseball teams in Japan
Nippon Professional Baseball pitchers
San Jose Bees players
Seibu Lions players
Baseball people from Wakayama Prefecture
People from Wakayama (city)